WJED-LP (107.9 FM) is a radio station that airs a Spanish variety format format. Licensed to Guanica, Puerto Rico, the station serves the southern Puerto Rico area. The station is currently owned by Onda Cultural del Sur, Inc.

On August 25, 2017, WJED-LP filed an application to move its frequency to 90.9 MHz and will change its city of license to Guanica-Yauco. On August 31, The application was dismissed and on September 1, an amendment was received. On September 19, The WJED-LP transmitter site was destroyed due to the damage caused by Hurricane Maria across Puerto Rico. The station returned to the air on March 19, 2018. On January 7, 2020, The station's transmitter and building were affected and destroyed due to the earthquakes that hit the island.

External links

JED-LP
Radio stations established in 2017
2017 establishments in Puerto Rico
Guánica, Puerto Rico